The 2016 Challenge Cup Final was the 115th cup-deciding game of the rugby league 2016 Challenge Cup Season. It was held at Wembley Stadium in London on 27 August 2016, kick off 15:00. The final was contested by Hull F.C. and Warrington Wolves. The game saw Hull F.C. beat Warrington by 12 points to 10.

Route to the final

Hull F.C.
Hull's sixth round tie saw a comfortable 47–18 point win over St Helens, before playing a 22–8 victory over Catalans Dragons in the quarter finals. The semi-finals saw them beat eventual Grand Final Champions Wigan Warriors to reach the final.

Warrington Wolves
Warrington's sixth round tie saw them play Championship side Oldham Roughyeds, beating them by sixty points. The quarter finals and semi-finals saw the Warriors draw fellow Super League sides Widnes Vikings and Wakefield Trinity respectively. The Wolves escaped the quarters by two points before a comfortable win against Wakefield put them in the final.

Pre-match
A military brass band provided musical entertainment before Welsh singer Aled Jones led the RFL Community Choir in singing "Abide with Me" before the match.

Match details

References

Challenge Cup finals
Hull F.C. matches
Warrington Wolves matches
August 2016 sports events in the United Kingdom
2016 sports events in London